O Garatuja is an opera composed by Ernst Mahle in 2005, with libretto written by Eugênio Leandro.  The opera is based on the homonymous novel by José de Alencar (1873) and premiered in Piracicaba at the Teatro Municipal "Dr Losso Netto," on 27 April 2006.

References

Operas
2006 operas
Portuguese-language operas
Operas based on novels